Steigenberger Parkhotel Düsseldorf (originally the Parkhotel) is a 5-Star Steigenberger Hotel in Düsseldorf, Germany, located on the city's famous Königsallee and next to the Hofgarten and the opera house.

History

The Parkhotel was opened in 1902.

Steigenberger

The hotel was bought by Steigenberger Hotels in 2004. The family-owned company was acquired in 2009 by Egyptian firm Travco Group, Travco maintains operating the hotel under the Steigenberger brand.

See also 

 Breidenbacher Hof

References

External links 

Official site 

Hotels in Düsseldorf
1902 establishments in Germany
Hotel buildings completed in 1902